The 1952 West Texas State Buffaloes football team represented West Texas State College—now known as West Texas A&M University—as a member of the Border Conference during the 1952 college football season. Led by ninth-year head coach Frank Kimbrough, the Buffaloes  compiled an overall record of 3–6 with a mark of 1–4 in conference play, placing seventh the Border Conference.

Schedule

References

West Texas State
West Texas A&M Buffaloes football seasons
West Texas State Buffaloes football